This is a list of properties and districts in Decatur County, Georgia that are listed on the National Register of Historic Places (NRHP).

Current listings

|}

References

Decatur County
Buildings and structures in Decatur County